Harrison Reginald Gorringe (7 March 1928 – 25 June 2017) was a first-class cricketer who played for Western Australia from 1951 to 1958.

A right-arm fast-medium bowler, Gorringe was a regular member of the West Australian team for eight seasons. His best performance came in the Sheffield Shield in 1952-53 when he took 3 for 82 and 8 for 56 against Queensland at the WACA in Perth. He began the Queensland second innings by taking four wickets before conceding a run, and later took three wickets in one over.

In a long career at Perth Cricket Club, Gorringe took 550 wickets from 1945 to 1962. He is a member of the Perth CC Team of the Century.

References

1928 births
2017 deaths
Western Australia cricketers
Australian cricketers
Cricketers from Perth, Western Australia